VLS-1 V02 was the second flight of the VLS-1 rocket on December 11, 1999 from the Alcântara Launch Center, with the objective of placing the SACI-2 microsatellite in Earth orbit. The rocket was remotely destroyed 3 minutes after launch.

Origins
The mission had the objectives of placing the SACI-2 satellite in orbit at 750 kilometers from Earth, after SACI-1, launched by China, was lost due to a transmitter failure, and of continuing the certification process of the VLS rocket. It was the second launch of VLS-1, with the first being lost shortly after launch. The launch campaign was called "Operation Almenara" and happened after the necessary modifications after the first accident had been made. The total cost of the operation was US$ 7.4 million and budget constraints prevented a test launch before the official launch.

In March 1999 the preparations at the Alcântara Launch Center were already underway. On June 18, Defense Minister Élcio Álvares observed the rocket's assembly and integration activities at the Aeronautics Institute of Technology.

The launch was planned for November 20, 1999, but tests of SACI-2 in the thermo-vacuum chamber indicated a failure in one of the electronic components. The rocket was ready by the same month. It was later scheduled for December 7, but was postponed due to problems with the rocket. On the same day, December 7, the launch center teams wrapped up the simulated countdown.

About 600 people were involved in the launch and the airspace in the region was closed for about three hours.

Launch
The rocket, with 43 tons of solid fuel, was launched on December 11, 1999, at 18:40 (UTC), after a ten minute delay, with the four strap-on boosters having worked correctly, as well as the other systems. However, it was remotely destroyed after 3m30s into the mission due to the second stage not being activated. The debris fell within the interdicted area.

The announcement of the failure only came one hour and 20 minutes after the accident. According to the official version, Brigadier Tiago Ribeiro, responsible for the announcement, would have been ill due to emotion after the accident.

Aftermath
The announcement came from the INPE directorate in São José dos Campos, about an hour before an official military announcement. The Brazilian Air Force relied on help from fishing communities to locate the wreckage. Among military circles there were rumors that the VLS had been the victim of sabotage.

The Brazilian and international media had difficulty communicating with their newspapers due to overloaded Internet. The failure led INPE to cancel the microsatellite program.

The investigation revealed that the accident was due to a flame penetration of the second stage block and the front flexible heat shield flap. The next launch, VLS-1 V03, was finally scheduled for 2003. However, on August 22, 2003, three days before the launch, the rocket was destroyed at its base due to an accidental ignition, causing 21 deaths. VLS-1 V04 had 70% of its structure built, but the program was terminated in 2016.

References

Notes

Bibliography

(Chronological order)

Test spaceflights
Satellite launch failures
Rocket launches in 1999
1999 in Brazil